Ambilobe Airport  is an airport serving Ambilobe, a city in the Antsiranana province in Madagascar.

Facilities

References

External links
 

Airports in Madagascar
Antsiranana Province